Bathyclarias longibarbis is a species of airbreathing catfish endemic to Lake Malawi, in the countries of Malawi, Mozambique and Tanzania.  This species grows to a length of 76 cm TL (29.9 inches).  This species is commercially caught for human consumption.

References

 

Bathyclarias
Fish of Africa
Fish described in 1933
Taxa named by E. Barton Worthington
Taxonomy articles created by Polbot